

Codes

References

Q